The Tippecanoe sequence was the cratonic sequence--that is, the marine transgression--that followed the Sauk sequence; it extended from roughly the Middle Ordovician to the Early Devonian.

Sedimentary characteristics

After the regression of the Sauk Sea early in the Ordovician, the exposed craton for a time underwent vigorous erosion, due to being located in a tropical climate; indeed, at this point in the Paleozoic the North American continent roughly straddled the equator.  

The Tippecanoe transgression ended this period of erosion, beginning with the deposition of clean sandstones across the craton, followed by abundant carbonate deposition.  In the east these carbonates gradually become shales, representing sediments eroded from highlands created in the Taconic orogeny.  

The Tippecanoe sequence may have been the deepest of the Paleozoic.  At one point during the Silurian period, the Taconic highlands—which later became the Appalachian Mountains--were the only part of North America that was not submerged.  The massive evaporite deposits of the Michigan Basin were formed during this period.

The Tippecanoe sequence ended with a regression in the early Devonian, to be followed later by the Kaskaskia sequence.

References

Ordovician United States
Silurian United States
Devonian United States